The Piano Tuner of Earthquakes is a 2005 animated drama film by the Brothers Quay, featuring Amira Casar, Gottfried John, Assumpta Serna and Cesar Sarachu. It was the second feature-length film by the Brothers Quay and their first film in over ten years.

Plot

A 19th-century opera singer is murdered on-stage shortly before her forthcoming wedding. Soon after being slain by the nefarious Dr. Emmanuel Droz during a live performance, Malvina van Stille is spirited away to the inventor's remote villa to be reanimated and forced to play the lead in a grim production staged to recreate her abduction. As the time for the performance draws near, piano tuner of earthquakes Felisberto sets out to activate the seven essential automata who dot the dreaded doctor's landscape and make sure all the essential elements are in place. Once again instilled with life after her brief stay in the afterworld, amnesiac Malvina is soon drawn to the mysterious Felisberto as a result of his uncanny resemblance to her one-time fiancé Adolfo.

See also
List of stop-motion films

External links
The Piano Tuner of Earthquakes at Metacritic
The Piano Tuner of Earthquakes at Rotten Tomatoes
''The Piano Tuner of Earthquakes' at MovieScore Media
 
 
 

2005 films
Films directed by the Brothers Quay
2000s American animated films
American children's fantasy films
American teen LGBT-related films
British animated films
British children's fantasy films
Films about child abuse
Films about nightmares
German animated films
2005 horror films
Films about dreams
2000s French animated films
2000s Portuguese-language films
2000s stop-motion animated films
2000s English-language films
2005 multilingual films
American multilingual films
British multilingual films
German multilingual films
2000s British films
2000s German films